Keith Francis may refer to:
 Keith Francis (cricketer)
 Keith Francis (runner)